Llwchwr is a community and (from 2022) electoral ward in the central western part of the City and County of Swansea, Wales, UK.

The population of Llwchwr, as recorded at the 2011 census, was 9,134.

The community is home to Garden Village FC of the Welsh Football League, Carmarthenshire League Division 2 outfit Loughor Rovers, and Loughor RFC who play in ASDA Nation League Division 1 West.

The community of Llwchwr, together with that of Gorseinon, is twinned with Ploërmel in France.

Governance
The community, which has its own community council, Llwchwr Town Council, comprising the town of Loughor and the adjacent village of Kingsbridge, (The south east of the town of Gorseinon), plus Llewitha and is divided for electoral purposes into the community wards of Garden Village, Kingsbridge, Lower Loughor and Upper Loughor. From 1974 to 1996 Llwchwr formed part of the Lliw Valley district of the county of West Glamorgan. It also includes the southern suburbs of Gorseinon town and Garden Village.

Effective from the 2022 local elections Llwchwr became an electoral ward for Swansea Council, electing three county councillors.

References

Communities in Swansea
Swansea electoral wards